Anurag Agrawal (born 1972) is an Indian pulmonologist, medical researcher, Dean of the Trivedi School of Biosciences at Ashoka University, and the former director of the Institute of Genomics and Integrative Biology, a CSIR institution. Known for his studies on lung diseases, Agrawal has been a senior fellow of the DBT-Wellcome Trust. The Council of Scientific and Industrial Research, the apex agency of the Government of India for scientific research, awarded him the Shanti Swarup Bhatnagar Prize for Science and Technology, one of the highest Indian science awards for his contributions to Medical Sciences in 2014. He is also a recipient of the National Bioscience Award for Career Development of the Department of Biotechnology which he received in 2015 and the 2020 Sun Pharma Science Foundation award in Medical Sciences (Clinical Research) .

Biography 

Anurag Agrawal joined the All India Institute of Medical Sciences, Delhi in 1989 for his MBBS after which he moved to the US for his residency at the Baylor College of Medicine where he also worked as a fellow at the Department of Pulmonary and Critical Care and as an assistant professor. In 2004, he enrolled for his doctoral studies at the Vallabhbhai Patel Chest Institute of the University of Delhi from where he secured a PhD in 2007. Subsequently, he joined the Institute of Genomics and Integrative Biology (IGIB) of the Council of Scientific and Industrial Research and served as the director. In 2022, he joined Ashoka University as the Dean, Biosciences and Health Research, heading the Trivedi School of Biosciences. 

Agrawal's research covers the fields of lung diseases, asthma and functional issues related to mitochondria and he is credited with establishing a functional link between the three diseases, thereby elucidating how stem cells donated mitochondrial cells to human lung cells that had turned dysfunctional. He is involved in translational research on disorders such as obesity, asthma and diabetes. His studies have been documented in a number of articles a

Awards and honors 
Agrawal received the Lady Tata Young Researcher Award in 2010, the same year as he was selected for the Swarnajayanthi fellowship of the Department of Biotechnology. The Council of Scientific and Industrial Research awarded him the Shanti Swarup Bhatnagar Prize, one of the highest Indian science awards in 2014. A year later, he received the National Bioscience Award for Career Development for the year 2015. He is also a recipient of the senior fellowship of the Wellcome Trust DBT India Alliance. He received the 2020 Sun Pharma Science Foundation award in Medical Sciences (Clinical Research). He is a fellow of all three national science academies and the national academy of medical sciences.

Selected bibliography

See also 

 Stem cell therapy
 Respirometry

References

External links 

Recipients of the Shanti Swarup Bhatnagar Award in Medical Science
1972 births
Indian scientific authors
Living people
Indian medical researchers
Medical doctors from Delhi
Indian pulmonologists
Indian medical writers
All India Institute of Medical Sciences, New Delhi alumni
Baylor College of Medicine alumni
Baylor College of Medicine faculty
Academic staff of Delhi University
Delhi University alumni
N-BIOS Prize recipients